El Juicio de Paris (The Judgment of Paris in English) is an oil-on-canvas painting of the Greek myth, the Judgement of Paris. It was executed in 1904 by Enrique Simonet, a Spanish painter, and is one of the many works depicting the scene. It is owned by heirs of Simonet, and is in the Museo de Málaga.

See also
The Judgement of Paris (Rubens)

References

External links
DEADLINK 

1904 paintings
Judgment of Paris
Paintings depicting Greek myths
Spanish paintings
Aphrodite
Paintings of Athena
Paintings of Hera
Nude art
Sheep in art
Birds in art